Formose Mendy (born 8 October 1993) is a French professional footballer who plays as a centre-back for  club Avranches.

Club career
Mendy signed a contract with Zulte Waregem in 2013, having come through the youth system at Lille. In May 2014 he signed a two-year extension with the club with the option of two further years.

In July 2016 Mendy signed a two-year contract with Red Star. He was appointed captain during the 2017–18 season, following the injury to Matthieu Fontaine. He extended his contract at the club for a further three years in May 2018.

In July 2020, Mendy joined Championnat National rivals US Boulogne.

On 22 July 2022, Mendy signed a two-year deal with Avranches in Championnat National.

International career
Mendy is a France youth international of Bissau-Guinean descent, capped nine times at Under-17 level. He was called up to the preliminary squad for Guinea Bissau for the 2017 Africa Cup of Nations.

References

External links

Living people
1993 births
People from Lagny-sur-Marne
Footballers from Seine-et-Marne
French people of Bissau-Guinean descent
Association football defenders
French footballers
France youth international footballers
US Torcy players
INF Clairefontaine players
Lille OSC players
S.V. Zulte Waregem players
Red Star F.C. players
US Boulogne players
US Avranches players
Belgian Pro League players
Championnat National players
Ligue 2 players
Championnat National 3 players
French expatriate footballers
Expatriate footballers in Belgium
French expatriate sportspeople in Belgium